Otto G. Krueger (September 7, 1890 – June 6, 1963) was a North Dakota politician who served as the North Dakota State Treasurer and the North Dakota Insurance Commissioner at different periods during the 1940s. He later served as a U.S. Representative from his state in the 1950s.

Biography
Krueger was born of German parents in the Volinia district of southwest Russia in 1890. He attended grade and high school in Russian and German schools, and immigrated to the United States in June 1910 and settled in Fessenden, North Dakota. He furthered his education through grade and high schools and two years of business school in Fargo, North Dakota and Great Falls, Montana. During the First World War he served as a private in the Infantry from April 1918 to May 1919, with overseas service in the 91st division. He served as the county auditor for Wells County, North Dakota from 1920 to 1940 and a clerk of the Fessenden School District from 1922 to 1940. He was elected as the North Dakota State Treasurer in 1944, but resigned from the position on September 7, 1945. His resignation was in order to fill the office of North Dakota Insurance Commissioner which was vacated by the late Oscar E. Erickson. He served in that capacity until 1950 when he did not seek re-election. After leaving the office, he served as the treasurer of the Republican Party until 1952.

Krueger was elected as a Republican to the Eighty-third, Eighty-fourth, and Eighty-fifth Congresses (January 3, 1953 - January 3, 1959). Krueger voted in favor of the Civil Rights Act of 1957. He was not a candidate for renomination in 1958. Krueger moved to Lodi, California, in 1959 and engaged in accounting and farming. He died there on June 6, 1963, and was interred in Cherokee Memorial Park Cemetery.

References

Sources

1890 births
1963 deaths
American people of German-Russian descent
State treasurers of North Dakota
Insurance Commissioners of North Dakota
Emigrants from the Russian Empire to the United States
People from Wells County, North Dakota
United States Army soldiers
People from Lodi, California
Republican Party members of the United States House of Representatives from North Dakota
20th-century American politicians